Teulisna nebulosa is a moth in the family Erebidae. It was described by Francis Walker in 1862. It is found on Peninsular Malaysia and Borneo. The habitat consists of lower montane forests.

There is strong sexual dimorphism in adults. Males are dull pale orange and females are paler straw.

References

Moths described in 1862
nebulosa